Chad Aaron Levitt (born November 21, 1975) is an American former NFL football player.

He is Jewish, was born in Melrose Park, Pennsylvania, is 6'1", and had a playing weight of 231 pounds.  He played high school football, and wrestled and competed in track and field, for Cheltenham High School, from which he graduated in 1993.

In football his  in his senior year set a new Cheltenham High School single season rushing record, and he was First-team and Outstanding Player of Suburban One Liberty League, Academic All-League, and a Montgomery County All Star. In wrestling, he was a Suburban One All-Star. In shot put and in the 4x100 relay, he was First-team All-League. He was awarded the 1993 B'nai B'rith Sports Lodge Ted Domsky Memorial Scholar-Athlete Award.

Levitt played college football for Cornell University, as a running back. He was three-time All-Ivy, and an Associated Press All-American selection as a senior. He set a Cornell and Ivy League career record for most rushing attempts (922), and a Cornell-best record for  rushing games in a career (24).

He was drafted by the Oakland Raiders in the 4th round of the 1997 NFL Draft.  He played two seasons in the National Football League.  In 1999, he played for the St. Louis Rams, and in 1997 for the Oakland Raiders.

In 1997, he was named the Marty Glickman Outstanding Jewish Scholastic (college) Athlete of the Year by US Jewish Sports Hall of Fame.  In 2008, he was inducted into the Philadelphia Jewish Sports Hall of Fame.  He is also a member of the Cornell Athletic Hall of Fame.

References

1975 births
Living people
Jewish American sportspeople
Players of American football from Pennsylvania
Oakland Raiders players
St. Louis Rams players
Cornell Big Red football players
People from Cheltenham, Pennsylvania
Sportspeople from Montgomery County, Pennsylvania
21st-century American Jews